is a girls' junior and senior high school operated by Showa Women's University. It is within two separate buildings on the campus in Setagaya, Tokyo.  the principal is Tomoko Kaneko.

1922 was its year of establishment of a five-year institute to enter Showa Women's University. A new junior high and high school opened in 1947 and 1948, respectively.

References

External links
 Showa Women's University Junior-Senior High School
 Showa Women's University Junior-Senior High School 

Girls' schools in Japan
High schools in Tokyo
1922 establishments in Japan
Educational institutions established in 1922
University-affiliated secondary schools
Showa Women's University